Kanzi (born October 28, 1980), also known by the lexigram  (from the character 太), is a male bonobo who has been the subject of several studies on great ape language. According to Sue Savage-Rumbaugh, a primatologist who has studied the bonobo throughout her life, Kanzi has exhibited advanced linguistic aptitude.

Biography 
Kanzi was born to Lorel and Bosandjo at Yerkes Field Station at Emory University in 1980. Shortly after birth Kanzi was stolen and adopted by a more dominant female, Matata, the matriarch of the group. 

In 1985, Kanzi was moved to the Language Research Center at Georgia State University.  He was later relocated, along with his sister, Panbanisha, to the Great Ape Trust, in Des Moines, Iowa.  The ill-fated facility, founded in 2004 by local businessman, Ted Townsend, closed after losing funding, experiencing allegations of neglect, and  a flood.  

In 2013, the Ape Cognition and Conservation Initiative (ACCI), under the direction of Jared Taglialatela, a professor at Kennesaw State University in Georgia, and Bill Hopkins, a professor at Georgia State University, took over the facility. 

When the ACCI took over Kanzi's care in 2013, he was severely obese due to mismanagement of his diet and activity. His new caretakers changed Kanzi's diet to a more species-appropriate one and increased his opportunities for physical activity. Kanzi has since lost over seventy-five pounds. 

As an infant, Kanzi accompanied Matata to sessions where Matata was taught language through keyboard lexigrams, but showed little interest in the lessons. It was a great surprise to researchers then when one day, while Matata was away, Kanzi began competently using the lexigrams, becoming not only the first observed ape to have learned aspects of language naturalistically rather than through direct training, but also the first observed bonobo to appear to use some elements of language at all. Within a short time, Kanzi had mastered the ten words that researchers had been struggling to teach his adoptive mother, and he has since learned more than 348, which he can also combine for new meaning.  When he hears a spoken word (through headphones, to filter out nonverbal clues), he points to the correct lexigram. He can initiate communication using the lexigrams.  Sue Savage Rumbaugh, in 2006, claimed Kanzi understands about 3,000 spoken words.  

According to a Discover article, Kanzi is an accomplished tool user.

Kanzi's adoptive mother, Matata, was believed to be in her mid- to late- 40s when she died in June 2014. In the matriarchal society of bonobos, a male's position is primarily determined by the position of the females he is related to. Matata was the group's chief leader so his status as the highest ranking male was established by being adopted as her "son". According to Smithsonian Magazine, Kanzi "has the mien of an aging patriarch – he's balding and paunchy with serious, deep-set eyes." This description is confirmed by a full-page color photograph of Kanzi in the March 2008 National Geographic, and a full-page black-and-white photograph in Time magazine.

Examples of behavior and abilities 

Kanzi's behavior and abilities have been the topic of research published in scientific journals, as well as reports in popular media.

Research programs

When he was eight years old, Kanzi was a subject of a research program in which his ability to respond to spoken requests was compared with that of a two-year-old human child called Alia. The study took nine months to complete. Kanzi and Alia were given 660 spoken instructions, asking them to deal with familiar objects in novel ways. Kanzi responded correctly to 74 percent of the instructions, Alia to 65 percent.

Another study, designed and carried out by archaeologists Kathy Schick and Nicholas Toth, aimed to compare Kanzi's cognitive and mechanical abilities with those of early human ancestors who made and used Early Stone Age tools (probably Homo habilis), such as Oldowan stone flakes and cores (a core is the rock from which a flake has been removed). In this study, Schick and Toth showed Kanzi how to flake stone, producing a sharp edge that could be used to cut through a rope in order to gain access to a food reward. After modeling the flaking behavior on a variety of occasions, the researchers set up each experiment by placing a food reward inside a box with a transparent lid which was held closed by a length of rope. Kanzi would then be led into an enclosure where the box was located and provided with the stones needed for flaking (known as chert or flint). Over the course of this multi-year study, Kanzi not only learned how to flake, he also developed his own method by throwing the cobbles onto hard surfaces to make a flake, as opposed to the hand-held percussion method that was modeled for him. With the many sharp flakes he produced, Kanzi was able to cut through the rope to gain access to the food reward. However, the flakes he produced and used were more crude than those produced by Early Stone Age humans.

A similar study on the flaking abilities of chimpanzees failed to recreate the findings with Kanzi. The authors suggest that the discrepancies in findings are due to the differences in rearing backgrounds of the subjects. Whilst Kanzi spent a significant portion of his life around humans and being trained by them (leading to a high level of enculturation), the chimpanzees in the recent study were not trained or demonstrated how to make or use flakes (or in any other human behaviours). This may explain why Kanzi was able to develop flaking after observing humans, and the chimpanzees in the recent study were not.

Anecdotes

Kanzi is recognized for his ability to "evoke absent objects, invent new formulas to describe elements whose names he did not know...he had a certain notion of time and seemed to understand another's point of view." The following are anecdotes, rather than experimental demonstrations.

 In an outing in the woods in Georgia, Kanzi touched the symbols for "marshmallows" and "fire". Susan Savage-Rumbaugh said in an interview that, "Given matches and marshmallows, Kanzi snapped twigs for a fire, lit them with the matches and toasted the marshmallows on a stick." The Telegraph has published photographs of Kanzi putting together a fire for food.
 Paul Raffaele, at Savage-Rumbaugh's request, performed a haka for the Bonobos. This Māori war dance includes thigh-slapping, chest-thumping, and shouting. Almost all the bonobos present interpreted this as an aggressive display, and reacted with loud screams, tooth-baring, and pounding the walls and the floor. Kanzi, who remained calm, communicated with Savage-Rumbaugh using bonobo vocalizations; Savage-Rumbaugh interpreted these vocalizations, and said to Raffaele, "he'd like you to do it again just for him, in a room out back, so the others won't get upset." Later, a private performance in another room was carried out.
 Savage-Rumbaugh has observed Kanzi in communication to his sister. In this experiment, Kanzi was kept in a separate room of the Great Ape Project and shown some yogurt. Kanzi made some vocalizations that his sister could hear; his sister, Panbanisha, who could not see the yogurt, then pointed to the lexigram for yogurt, suggesting those vocalizations may have meaning.
 In one demonstration on the television show Champions of the Wild, Kanzi was shown playing the arcade game Pac-Man and understanding how to beat it.

Language 
Although Kanzi learned to communicate using a keyboard with lexigrams, Kanzi also picked up some American Sign Language from watching videos of Koko the gorilla, who communicated using sign language to her keeper Penny Patterson; Savage-Rumbaugh did not realize Kanzi could sign until he signed, "You, Gorilla, Question", to anthropologist Dawn Prince-Hughes, who had previously worked closely with gorillas. Based on trials performed at Yerkes Primate Research Center, Kanzi was able to identify symbols correctly 89–95% of the time.
Kanzi cannot speak in a manner that is comprehensible to most humans, as bonobos have different vocal tracts than humans, which makes them incapable of reproducing most of the vocal sounds humans can make. Nonetheless, it was noticed that every time Kanzi communicated with humans with specially-designed graphic symbols, he also produced some vocalization.  Later, it was discovered that Kanzi was producing the articulatory equivalent of the symbols he was indicating, although in a very high pitch and with distortions.

According to the research of Dr. Sue Savage-Rumbaugh, Kanzi "can understand individual spoken words and how they are used in novel sentences". For example, the researcher asked Kanzi to go get the carrot in the microwave, Kanzi went directly to the microwave and completely ignored the carrot that was closer to him, but not in the microwave. In another example, a researcher gave the task, "feed your ball some tomato". Alia, a human 2-year-old, did not know what to do, but Kanzi immediately used a spongy toy Halloween pumpkin as a ball and began to feed the toy.

Limitations 
Although Kanzi is considered to be the best case for apes acquiring language-like capabilities, his sentences were not equivalent to that of a 3-year old child. His semantic, syntactic and morphological abilities showed significant differences. For example, Kanzi did not use the word "strawberry" the same way a human child would. When he used "strawberry" it could mean a request to go to where the strawberries grow, a request to eat some, it could also have been as a name, and so on.

Kanzi also showed no ability in the use of function words, nor could he make use of morphology, such as indicating the plural form of a noun. Lastly, Kanzi did not display recursion, meaning that there was an upper bound to the length of his sentences that cannot be exceeded.

See also 
 Ape language
 Evolution of language
 Human Ape, a National Geographic documentary film
 List of individual apes
 Yerkish
Other animals used in language studies:

 Akeakamai
 Alex (parrot)
 Batyr
 Chantek
 Koko
 Kosik
 Nim Chimpsky
 Nyota
 Panbanisha
 Washoe

References

Further reading 
 Joseph, John E., Nigel Love & Talbot J. Taylor (2001). Landmarks in Linguistic Thought II: The Western Tradition in the 20th Century (London & New York: Routledge), chapter 15: "Kanzi on Human Language".
 de Waal, Frans (2005). Our Inner Ape, .
 Raffaele, Paul (2006), "The Smart and Swinging Bonobo", Smithsonian, Volume 37, Number 8 (November 2006—a general article about bonobos).

External links 

 60 Minutes Australia Talk to the Animals October 2011 featuring Kanzi
 
The Gentle Genius of Bonobos, TED talk in part about Kanzi
 Video documentary site by Sue Savage-Rumbaugh containing a documentary featuring Kanzi
 Speaking Bonobo article at the Smithsonianmag webpage

Apes from language studies
Ape Cognition and Conservation Initiative
Animal intelligence
1980 animal births
Individual bonobos